Gare aux gaffes du gars gonflé, written and drawn by Franquin and Jidéhem, is an album of the original Gaston Lagaffe series, numbered R3. It is made up of 52 pages and was published by Dupuis. It consists of a series of one-strip gags.

Story
Longtarin appears for the first time and watch over Gaston very carefully, all the more as he Gaston have acquired a strange automobile. Gaston signs a contract with De Mesmaeker.

Inventions
vehicle to take downstairs: vehicle  which slides on the ballisters, but cannot turn
filter for cigarettes:  filter which causes explosions, the rights were bought by a joke shop
ejector seat for cars : seat not to leave lying in offices, for it can be dangerous for someone
machine to cork bottles : machine that must been well-adjusted, at the risk of damages
mini-go-kart : roller skate with the engine of a lawn mower
petrol for rockets: dangerous petrol powder
coffee maker with petrol : coffee maker which can take off like a rocket
table: table hanged up to the ceiling to ease cleanup.
relax-armchair: armchair with instructions for use that must be read before using
swing with elasticated strings : swing with amplified movements
overcoat linked to the central heating: allows to work having warm
filing system: system consisting in tying each document to the ceiling with an elasticated thread
automatic polishing: automatic machine to polish shoes, and occasionally trousers
special flash: too strong flash that sets fire to clothes
thread for Christmas trees: thread which make the tree turn, so that one can see the hidden part of it, and with the possibility to regulate the speed

Background
This album is made up of the gags previously published in the small-sized albums Gare aux Gaffes and Les Gaffes d'un Gars Gonflé, numbered #1 and #5. It was first published in 1966 in a small format under the title Gare aux gaffes. It was re-edited in 1973 in a casual format. This is the first album of the series which contains full page strips.

References

 Gaston Lagaffe classic series on the official website
 Publication in Spirou  on bdoubliées.com.

External links
Official website 

1973 graphic novels
Comics by André Franquin